Lynovytsia is an urban-type settlement in Pryluky Raion, Chernihiv Oblast, Ukraine. It hosts the administration of Lynovytsia settlement hromada, one of the hromadas of Ukraine. The population is

History 
The village was first mentioned in 1629, when a census was conducted.

It was a settlement in Pyriatyn uyezd of Poltava Governorate of the Russian Empire.

During World War II it was occupied by Axis troops between September 1941 and September 1943.

Urban-type settlement since October 1960. In 1972 there were a sugar plant, a bakery, one sovkhoz, two schools and a library.

In 1985 a post office was built here.

In January 1989, population was 3440 people.

In January 2013, population was 2743 people.

Transport 

 a railway station of the Southern Railway (since 1912)

References

Urban-type settlements in Pryluky Raion